The Golf Illustrated Gold Vase was a prestigious amateur golf tournament in England. It was a 36-hole scratch stroke play competition.

History
The contest for a gold vase was announced in The Times on 3 April 1909. The vase, valued at 250 guineas, was presented by the proprietors the Golf Illustrated. The initial event was to be at Mid-Surrey on 17 June and was open to amateurs with a handicap of scratch or better. The vase would be held by the winner's home club and the winner himself would receive a silver replica. Three consecutive wins would win the vase outright.

Winners

References

External links

Amateur golf tournaments in the United Kingdom
Golf tournaments in England
Vase sports trophies